The 2021–22 Kansas Jayhawks men's basketball team represented the University of Kansas in the 2021–22 NCAA Division I men's basketball season, which was the Jayhawks' 124th basketball season. The Jayhawks, members of the Big 12 Conference, played their home games at Allen Fieldhouse in Lawrence, Kansas. They were led by 19th year Hall of Fame head coach Bill Self. The Jayhawks finished the season 34–6 and won their 4th NCAA Tournament National Championship, their first since 2008, and their 6th National Championship overall.

Season notes
The Jayhawks experienced massive roster turnover in the offseason having lost eight players to transfers, graduation, and entering the draft, but added a recruiting class ranked in the top 15 of every major recruiting website, and 4 transfers. They had more new players on their roster than returning players. Despite the turnover, the Jayhawks entered the season with high expectations. Joe Lunardi of ESPN projected them as a 1 seed in his initial 2022 NCAA tournament bracketology. The Jayhawks renewed their rivalry with Missouri on December 11. The Jayhawks defeated Missouri 102–65.

On April 2, 2021, Kansas signed Self to a lifetime contract. The contract will automatically add an extra year to every year he coaches until his retirement or death.

On October 14, 2021, when the Big 12 Preseason Media Poll was published, Kansas was projected to finish first in conference standings, which is the 19th time in 26 seasons of the Big 12's existence that the Jayhawks have been selected as the preseason favorite. They received 8 first-place votes and 80 total points.

The Associated Press (AP) released their preseason poll on October 18, 2021. The Jayhawks were ranked 3rd in the preseason poll. It was the 10th consecutive, 16th under Bill Self, and 24th time since the 1992-93 season KU was ranked 7th or higher in the preseason AP poll. It was also the 16th consecutive season KU was ranked in the preseason poll. It also marked KU being ranked in the preseason poll 31 of the previous 32 seasons.

After losing to Baylor on February 26 and TCU on March 1, the Jayhawks lost back-to-back games, which is only the 12th losing streak of any length under Self.

The Jayhawks defeated Texas on March 5 to clinch their 63rd regular season conference title, extending their NCAA record. It was also their 20th Big 12 title. It was also the 16th Big 12 title in the previous 18 seasons. The Jayhawks would also win the 2022 Big 12 tournament to earn their 50th NCAA Tournament appearance and their NCAA record extending 32nd consecutive. The tournament title was the Jayhawks 12th Big 12 Tournament title and their 16th overall.

After defeating Providence in the NCAA tournament, Kansas passed Kentucky to be the winningest program in the nation. The Jayhawks defeated North Carolina in the National Championship game 72–69 after trailing 25–40 at halftime. They trailed by as much as 16 completing the largest comeback in National Championship game history.

Roster changes

Coaching staff changes

Entered draft
Below are players who declared for the NBA draft. The class given is what their class was for the 2020–21 season. Seniors from the previous season, due to receiving an extra year of eligibility from the NCAA, had to declare to intention to enter the draft. If a player goes undrafted, they are eligible to return.

2021 recruiting class

|-
| colspan="7" style="padding-left:10px;" | Overall recruiting rankings:     247 Sports: 7     Rivals: 13       ESPN: 6''' 
|}

Transfers

Incoming

Outgoing

Walk-ons

Roster
Due to the cancellation of the 2020 NCAA tournament because of the COVID-19 pandemic, the NCAA granted 2021 seniors an extra year of eligibility. Mitch Lightfoot and Chris Teahan both returned for an extra year. Additionally, transfer Remy Martin took advantage of the extra year of eligibility by the NCAA.

Schedule

COVID-19 impact
Unlike the previous year, Kansas allowed full capacity crowds. The Jayhawks finished their non-conference schedule without any positive tests for COVID-19. They did, however, cancel two non-conference games and postpone a third conference game due to COVID-19 issues with their opponents. The non-conference games that were canceled were replaced with new opponents. The Jayhawks had their first confirmed case of COVID-19 on February 1, 2022, when Ochai Agbaji tested positive for the virus.

Results

|-
!colspan=12 style=| Exhibition

|-
!colspan=12 style=| Regular Season

|-
!colspan=12 style=| Big 12 Tournament

|-
!colspan=12 style=| NCAA Tournament

Rankings

References

Kansas Jayhawks men's basketball seasons
Kansas
2021 in sports in Kansas
2022 in sports in Kansas
Kansas
NCAA Division I men's basketball tournament Final Four seasons
NCAA Division I men's basketball tournament championship seasons